"All These Years" is a song written by Mac McAnally, originally recorded on his 1992 album Live and Learn.  It was later recorded by American country music group Sawyer Brown. It was released in November 1992 as the second single from their album Cafe on the Corner.  Their version peaked at 3 on the Billboard Hot Country Singles & Tracks (now Hot Country Songs) chart, in addition to being a minor AC hit, peaking at 42 on the Hot Adult Contemporary Tracks chart.

Content
The song opens with the story with an apparently serially unfaithful wife ("She likes adventure with security; and more than one man can provide") having an affair, and her husband catching her in a tryst ("She planned adventure feeling sure that he; Would not be home ‘til after five.")  Frustrated at the betrayal, he tells her he's been responsible and has been working hard to provide, despite their issues ("And I'm still here, until I'm gone.") He frustratingly realizes he can't trust her: "Don't you rub it in too hard that I've been wrong."

The wife responds, "You're not the man you used to be" to which he clarifies "Neither is this guy." She acknowledges both of their roles in the couple's issues ("There's some things you refuse to see; But I guess sometimes so do I.")  She states what she has done for the family, while he was working, she took care of their house and home and raised the family ("I made your supper and your daughter and your son,") and sees how much she stands to lose ("Still I'm here, and still confused; But I can finally see how much I stand to lose.")

The repeat of the final refrain, "I'm still here and so confused; But I can finally see how much I stand to lose; All these years," attributed to neither the husband nor the wife, indicates that both have seen what they have to lose, but are confused at the way forward.

Critical reception
Larry Flick, of Billboard magazine reviewed the song favorably, calling it "a downer, but effectively presented for a dreary breakup number." He goes on to says that the positive is that listeners feel like there was a "meeting of the minds".

Other versions
Mac McAnally recorded it on his 1993 album Live and Learn. McAnally's version was the b-side to the album's first single, which was its title track.

Chart positions
"All These Years" debuted at number 72 on the US Billboard Hot Country Singles & Tracks for the week of November 28, 1992.

Year-end charts

References

1992 singles
Mac McAnally songs
Sawyer Brown songs
Songs written by Mac McAnally
Music videos directed by Michael Salomon
Curb Records singles
1992 songs